Rolldown may refer to:
A game formerly offered by the Multi-State Lottery Association; replaced by [doodle LottO]
Roll-down curtain
Profiting from the passage of time in a positively sloped ("normal") yield curve
 Rolldown (album)